Bartulis or Bārtulis is the masculine form of a Lithuanian and Latvian surname. Its feminine forms in Lithuanian are Bartulienė (married woman or widow) and Bartulytė (unmarried woman), but in Latvian Bārtule. Notable people with the surname include:

A. C. Bartulis (1927–2011), American politician and businessman
Eugenijus Bartulis (born 1949), bishop of the Roman Catholic Diocese of Šiauliai
Vidmantas Bartulis (1954–2020), Lithuanian composer
Oskars Bārtulis (born 1987), Latvian ice hockey player

Latvian-language masculine surnames
Lithuanian-language surnames